John Livingstone-Learmonth  is a British wine writer. He has published four books on Rhône wines and has consulted on books such as the 'World Atlas of Wine' by Jancis Robinson and Hugh Johnson.

References

External links
Drink Rhone, Livingstone-Learmonth's website

Wine critics
Wine writers
Living people
Year of birth missing (living people)